Private Suit is the fourth studio album by Dutch indie rock band Bettie Serveert, and their first to be released on Parasol Records. It was released on September 5, 2000 through Parasol's subsidiary Hidden Agenda Records. It received generally favorable reviews from critics, with a score of 80 out of 100 on the critic review aggregator site Metacritic. One critic who did not like the album was Keith Harris, who wrote in the Chicago Reader that he thought the album "sounded false".

Track listing
Music by Bettie Serveert, lyrics by Carol van Dyk, except track 9.
"Unsound" – 4:32
"Satisfied" – 3:41
"Private Suit" – 4:32
"Mariachi Souls" – 3:19
"Recall" – 5:18
"Auf Wiedersehen" – 3:52
"Sower & Seeds" – 4:35
"White Tales" – 4:20
"My Fallen Words" – 2:47
"Healer" – 4:49

Personnel

Bettie Serveert
Carol van Dyk – vocal (all tracks), guitar (1,3-8,10,11), marimba (2), piano (2,4), hammond (11)
Peter Visser – guitar (1-3,5-9,11), synthesizer (1,2,5), backing vocal (1), organ (2,9), marimba (2,11), piano (5,8,10), vibraphone (11)
Herman Bunskoeke – bass (1-3,5-11), backing vocal (1), keyboard (2,8), piano (11)
Reinier Veldman – drums (1-3,5-11), octopad (2,5,11)

Additional personnel
Buni Lenski – violin (2,3,10)
Simon Lenski – cello (2,3,10)
Pascal Deweze – piano (6), backing vocal (6,8)
Allan Muller – backing vocal (6), synthesizer (8)
Bart Vincent – backing vocal (7,9)
John Parish – organ (1), tambourine (1,9,11), rhodes (2,9), congas (2,11), dobro (4), hammond (7), piano (8), marimba (11), producer, mixing, mastering
Sytze Gardenier- engineer

References

Bettie Serveert albums
2000 albums
Parasol Records albums
Albums produced by John Parish